The 1972 Honduran Cup was the second edition of the Honduran Cup, the tournament was renamed Copa Jefe de Estado due to political reasons; España won the trophy and Marathón was runner-up.

Group stage
The ten participant clubs were divided into two groups of three (3) and one group of four (4).  Due to the uneven number of teams on each group, the top two from group C (which contained 4 teams) advanced directly to the final round.  Meanwhile, groups A and B (containing only 3 teams) had the winners advancing directly and the runners-up facing in a one leg play-off match.

Group A

After a 3-way tie in points between all group contenders, a full rematch was scheduled between all three clubs.  The games were all re-played on 19 November at Estadio Tiburcio Carías Andino with a duration of 30 minutes each.  The re-match results were as follows:

 New standings:

Group B

Group C

Playoff

Final round
Also known as Pentagonal.

References

Honduran Cup seasons
Cup